O (О о; italics: О о) is a letter of the Cyrillic script.

History

The Cyrillic letter O was derived from the Greek letter Omicron (Ο ο).

Form

Modern fonts
In modern-style typefaces, the Cyrillic letter O looks exactly like the Latin letter O  and the Greek letter Omicron .

Church Slavonic printed fonts and Slavonic manuscripts
Historical typefaces (like poluustav (semi-uncial), a standard font style for the Church Slavonic typography) and old manuscripts represent several additional glyph variants of Cyrillic O, both for decorative and orthographic (sometimes also "hieroglyphic") purposes, namely:
 broad variant (Ѻ/ѻ), used mostly as a word initial letter (see Broad On for more details);
 narrow variant, being used now in Synodal Church Slavonic editions as the first element of digraph Oy/oy (see Uk (Cyrillic) for more details), and in the editions of Old Believers for unstressed "o" as well;
 variant with a cross inside (Crossed O), Ꚛ, used in certain manuscripts as the initial letter of words окрестъ 'around, nearby' (the root of this Slavonic word, крест, means 'cross') and округъ 'district, neighbourhood' with their derivatives;
 "eyed" variant (Monocular O) with a dot inside (Ꙩ/ꙩ), used in certain manuscripts in spelling of word око 'eye' and its derivatives. In many other texts, including the birchbark letters, the monocular O was not used as a hieroglyph but largely as a synonym of Broad On signalling the word-initial position;
 "two-eyed" variants (Binocular O) with two dots inside (Ꙫ/ꙫ or Ꙭ/ꙭ), also double "O" without dots inside were used in certain manuscripts in spelling of dual/plural forms of the words with the same root 'eye';
 "many-eyed" variant (Multiocular O), ꙮ, used in certain manuscripts in spelling of the same root when embedded into word многоочитый 'many-eyed' (an attribute of seraphim).

Usage
In Russian, O is used word-initially, after another vowel, and after non-palatalized consonants.

In Macedonian the letter represents the sound /ɔ/.

In Tuvan the Cyrillic letter can be written as a double vowel.

Related letters and other similar characters
Ο ο : Greek letter Omicron
O o : Latin letter O
0 : Digit Zero
Ё ё : Cyrillic letter Yo
Ѻ ѻ : Cyrillic letter Broad On
Ӧ ӧ : Cyrillic letter O with diaeresis
Ө ө : Cyrillic letter Oe
Ӫ ӫ : Cyrillic letter Oe with diaeresis
Ҩ ҩ : Cyrillic letter O-hook

Computing codes

Exotic glyph variants of Cyrillic O are available only in Unicode:
 broad Ѻ/ѻ:
 CYRILLIC CAPITAL LETTER ROUND OMEGA: U+047A
 CYRILLIC SMALL LETTER ROUND OMEGA: U+047B
 narrow ᲂ does not just represent itself, but also used in digraph Oy/oy:
 CYRILLIC SMALL LETTER NARROW O: U+1C82
 CYRILLIC CAPITAL LETTER UK: U+0478 (deprecated in favor of combination of Cyrillic letters О and у, U+041E U+0443)
 CYRILLIC SMALL LETTER UK: U+0479 (deprecated in favor of combination of Cyrillic letters о and у, U+043E U+0443 or U+1C82 U+0443)
 with a cross inside (Ꚛ/ꚛ):
 CYRILLIC CAPITAL LETTER CROSSED O: U+A69A
 CYRILLIC SMALL LETTER CROSSED O: U+A69B
 doubled Ꚙ/ꚙ:
 CYRILLIC CAPITAL LETTER DOUBLE O: U+A698
 CYRILLIC SMALL LETTER DOUBLE O: U+A699
 eyed Ꙩ/ꙩ:
 CYRILLIC CAPITAL LETTER MONOCULAR O: U+A668
 CYRILLIC SMALL LETTER MONOCULAR O: U+A669
 two-eyed (Ꙫ/ꙫ, Ꙭ/ꙭ):
 CYRILLIC CAPITAL LETTER BINOCULAR O: U+A66A
 CYRILLIC SMALL LETTER BINOCULAR O: U+A66B
 CYRILLIC CAPITAL LETTER DOUBLE MONOCULAR O: U+A66C
 CYRILLIC SMALL LETTER DOUBLE MONOCULAR O: U+A66D
 many-eyed ꙮ:
 CYRILLIC LETTER MULTIOCULAR O: U+A66E
 combining O for Church Slavonic abbreviations (as  =  '(Holy) Trinity'):
 COMBINING CYRILLIC LETTER O: 2DEA

References

External links

Vowel letters